Javier Pérez Iniesta (born March 16, 1970 in Madrid, Spain) is a retired basketball player.

Clubs
1988–90: Real Madrid
1990–98: Ourense Baloncesto
1998–99: Cantabria Baloncesto
1999–00: Gijón Baloncesto
2000–02: CI Rosalía de Castro

Awards
Copa del Rey (1): 1988–89
Saporta Cup (1): 1988–89

References
 ACB profile

1970 births
Living people
Spanish men's basketball players
Liga ACB players
Real Madrid Baloncesto players
Point guards
Basketball players from Madrid
Gijón Baloncesto players
Club Ourense Baloncesto players